George F. Moore (March 9, 1861 – May 24, 1938) was a Democratic politician from Idaho. He served as the fifth lieutenant governor of Idaho. Moore was elected in 1897 along with Governor Frank Steunenberg. He died in 1938 in Seattle, Washington.

References

Idaho Democrats
Lieutenant Governors of Idaho
1861 births
1938 deaths